Malesia is a monotypic moth genus in the subfamily Arctiinae. Its single species, Malesia eugoana, is found on Java and Borneo. Both the genus and species were first described by van Eecke in 1920.

References

Cisthenina
Monotypic moth genera
Moths of Asia